Paul Hilton (born 8 October 1959) is an English former professional footballer who played as a central defender making over 200 career appearances.

Career
Born in Oldham, Hilton represented England at under 18 level and played for Chadderton, Bury and West Ham United. Hilton was signed by West Ham manager, John Lyall, after he had appeared for Bury in a 10-0 League Cup defeat by West Ham. At the end of his playing career he became a coach under West Ham manager Billy Bonds and was appointed as youth team and then reserve team coach. In 2001, he was appointed coach at Ipswich Town. Hilton has also spent time as youth coach at Gillingham and in 2011 he was appointed Head of Youth at Stevenage.

References

1959 births
Living people
English footballers
Chadderton F.C. players
Bury F.C. players
West Ham United F.C. players
English Football League players
West Ham United F.C. non-playing staff
Gillingham F.C. non-playing staff
England youth international footballers
Association football defenders
Stevenage F.C. non-playing staff
People from Oldham
Ipswich Town F.C. non-playing staff
Association football coaches